Guillermo Ayoví Erazo (born November 10, 1930) better known as Papá Roncón is an Afro-Ecuadorian musician, singer, and marimba player.

September 30, 2022 Papa Roncón passed away at the age of 91 in Borbón, Esmeraldas

Early life
Papá Roncón was born in Borbón, Esmeraldas, Ecuador on November 10, 1930. He learned to play the marimba at an early age with the Chachi people. He began to make himself known in the 1970s, first in his village, and then at national and international levels, with tours in the United States, Venezuela, Colombia and Japan. In 2001 he received the Premio Eugenio Espejo for his contribution to the Ecuadorian culture through the practice and teaching of the marimba and traditional dances. He also directed several films, including documentaries.

Career
He is the founder of the school of traditional culture 'La Catanga', through which he has taught dozens of children and youth to play and dance marimba in the province of Esmeraldas.

Personal life
He has been married to his wife Grimalda for over 50 years, has 10 children,  14 grandchildren, and about 8 great-grandchildren.

References

External links
 

1930 births
Living people
Marimbists
20th-century Ecuadorian male singers
People from Esmeraldas, Ecuador
Afro-Ecuadorian